Red Baron Records was a jazz record company and label founded by Bob Thiele around 1991.

The Bob Thiele Collective, an all-star group, recorded three albums for the label which Thiele produced. Other new recordings included music by John Hicks, Steve Marcus, David Murray, Ali Ryerson, and McCoy Tyner. Red Baron's reissues included albums by Ruby Braff, Paul Desmond, Earl Hines, Mel Lewis, and the Modern Jazz Quartet. Its list of previously unreleased material included Duke Ellington and Billy Strayhorn. Red Baron folded in 1996 when Bob Thiele died.

Discography
Red Baron Records commenced released albums on compact disc in 1991 and continued until 1993.

References

American record labels
Jazz record labels
 
 
1991 establishments in the United States
1996 disestablishments in the United States
Record labels established in 1991
Record labels disestablished in 1996